Irena Stefania Latinik-Vetulani, Ph.D. (26 December 1904 – 2 February 1975) was a Polish biologist.

Biography 
She was the daughter of Polish Army general Franciszek Ksawery Latinik and his wife Helena. She had two sisters: Anna (1902–1969) and Antonina (1906–1989). She graduated in philosophy from Jagiellonian University and later went to Station biologique de Roscoff for scientific practice. After she returned to Poland, she was an assistant of professor Emil Godlewski Jr. in his laboratory. In 1927 she received her Ph.D. and Godlewski was her promoter. She worked on amphibian regeneration. Until 1938 she was an assistant to professor Henryk Hoyer.

In 1927 she married Adam Vetulani and had two sons: Jerzy (1936–2017) and Jan (1938–1965).

She published two popular science books: Krążenie pierwiastków w przyrodzie (The Circulation  of Elements in Nature, Książnica-Atlas, Warszawa, 1938) and Regeneracja, odtwarzanie utraconych części ciała (Regenaration of body parts, Czytelnik, Łódź, 1950). For many years she was publishing short articles in Wszechświat, a popular science monthly.

Vetulani spent World War II in Kraków, where she was working as a translator and taking care of her two children. She was raising her sons with a patriotic sense of honour. On 18 January 1945, which was the last day of German occupation in Kraków, she went to the window to open it to prevent it from breaking in case of a bomb explosion. At the same time there was an explosion outside and she was wounded by a shrapnel. She survived, however a piece of iron remained in her head for the rest of her life. Vetulani lost power over her left hand and her eyesight was reduced.

In 1965 her younger son, Jan, drowned in the Dunajec during a canoeing trip.

She died on 5 February 1975 and was buried at Rakowicki Cemetery.

Family tree

References 

Polish biologists
Jagiellonian University alumni
1904 births
1975 deaths
Burials at Rakowicki Cemetery
20th-century biologists